Aleksanteri (Aleksi) Hakala (5 November 1886, in Lappajärvi – 19 April 1959; original surname Sironen) was a Finnish farmer and politician. He was a member of the Parliament of Finland from 1927 to 1933, representing the Agrarian League.

References

1886 births
1959 deaths
People from Lappajärvi
People from Vaasa Province (Grand Duchy of Finland)
Centre Party (Finland) politicians
Members of the Parliament of Finland (1927–29)
Members of the Parliament of Finland (1929–30)
Members of the Parliament of Finland (1930–33)